Jacqui Chikuta (died 27 January 2021) was a Malawian politician.

Biography
She served as a member of the National Assembly of Malawi for the Malawi Congress Party from 2019 until her death in 2021 from COVID-19.

References

Year of birth missing
20th-century births
2021 deaths
Deaths from the COVID-19 pandemic in Malawi
Members of the National Assembly (Malawi)